Ivry-la-Bataille is a commune in the Eure Department  in the Normandy region in northern France. Ivry-la-Bataille was formerly known as Ivry.

History
King Henry IV of France won the Battle of Ivry near Ivry on 14 March 1590. The place was renamed Ivry-la-Bataille (Ivry-the-Battle) to commemorate the battle and to distinguish the town from Ivry-sur-Seine.

Geography
Ivry-la-Bataille is located on the river Eure in Normandy and about thirty miles (50 km) west of Paris, at the boundary between the Île-de-France and the Beauce regions.

Population

Sights
Château d'Ivry-la-Bataille

See also
Communes of the Eure department

References

External links

Official Web site

Communes of Eure